The Grand Babylon Hotel is a 1920 German silent mystery film directed by E.A. Dupont and starring Hans Albers, Max Landa and Karl Falkenberg. The film's title is drawn from the 1902 novel The Grand Babylon Hotel by Arnold Bennett.

Cast
 Hans Albers
 Max Landa
 Karl Falkenberg
 Toni Grünfeld
 Hanni Weisse
 Maria Zelenka

References

Bibliography
 Hunter, Jefferson. English Filing, English Writing. Indiana University Press. 2010.

External links 
 

1920 films
Films of the Weimar Republic
German mystery films
German silent feature films
Films directed by E. A. Dupont
1920 mystery films
German black-and-white films
Silent mystery films
1920s German films
1920s German-language films